Dudley Coulson (22 March 1929 – 1 August 1999) was a British-Kenyan field hockey player. He competed in the men's tournament at the 1956 Summer Olympics.

References

External links
 

1929 births
1999 deaths
Kenyan male field hockey players
Olympic field hockey players of Kenya
Field hockey players at the 1956 Summer Olympics
Sportspeople from Nairobi
Kenyan people of British descent
Kenyan emigrants to Australia
Sportspeople from Brisbane
British emigrants to Australia
Australian people of British descent